Shahin Bayani (in Persian شاهین بیانی) is an Iranian football defender who played for Iran in the 1984 Asian Cup. He also played for Esteghlal.

International Records

Honours 

Asian Cup:
Fourth Place : 1984

References

External links
Team Melli Stats

Iranian footballers
Living people
Esteghlal F.C. players
Al Ahli SC (Doha) players
Asian Games gold medalists for Iran
1962 births
Footballers at the 1986 Asian Games
Place of birth missing (living people)
Asian Games medalists in football
Footballers at the 1990 Asian Games
Qatar Stars League players
Association football defenders
Medalists at the 1990 Asian Games
Iran international footballers
20th-century Iranian people